Bùi Quang Vinh (born 8 August 1953 in Hanoi) is the Minister of Planning and Investment of Vietnam. He is a member of the 11th Central Committee of the Communist Party of Vietnam.

References

1953 births
Living people
Government ministers of Vietnam
People from Hanoi
Members of the 10th Central Committee of the Communist Party of Vietnam
Members of the 11th Central Committee of the Communist Party of Vietnam